
Gmina Chełm Śląski is a rural gmina (administrative district) in Bieruń-Lędziny County, Silesian Voivodeship, in southern Poland. The gmina also contains the villages of Chełm Mały ("Little Chełm") and Kopciowice.

Neighbouring gminas
Gmina Chełm Śląski is bordered by the towns of Bieruń, Imielin and Lędziny, and by the gmina of Chełmek.

References

Chelm Slaski
Bieruń-Lędziny County